This is a list that includes people involved in all varieties of clay pigeon shooting and olympic trap. The following people are involved, or have been involved in sport shooting in the United Kingdom:

 Alister Allan
 Edward Amoore
 David Ball
 George Barnes
 Richard Barnett
 John Bellamy
 Maurice Blood
 Henry Burr
 Henry Burt
 John Butt
 Arthur Carnell
 Geoffrey Coles
 Malcolm Cooper
 Hugh Durant
 Richard Faulds
 John Faunthorpe
 John Fleming
 Arthur Fulton
 William Grosvenor
 Aaron Heading
 Harold Humby
 Albert Kempster
 William Russell Lane-Joynt
 Edward Lessimore
 Henry Lynch-Staunton
 Cyril Mackworth-Praed
 Alexander Martin
 Maurice Matthews
 Alexander Maunder
 John MacGregor
 Joshua Millner
 William Milne
 Robert Murray
 Philip Neame
 Charles Nix
 Anita North
 Harcourt Ommundsen
 Charles Palmer
 Rachel Parish
 Edward Parnell
 Joseph Pepé
 Herbert Perry
 Prince Philip
 William Pimm
 Horatio Poulter
 Jan Powell
 Ted Ranken
 James Reid
 Philip Richardson
 Alexander Rogers
 Horatio Ross
 Steven Scott
 Ian Shaw
 Edward Skilton
 John Stafford
 Charles Stewart
 Jackie Stewart
 William Styles
 Jesse Wallingford
 Stevan Walton
 George Whitaker
 Allen Whitty
 Peter Wilson

References

British